The Oakland Mills Bridge is a historic structure located in Oakland Mills Park southwest of Mount Pleasant, Iowa, United States. In July 1876 the Henry County Board of Supervisors decided to locate the bridge over the Skunk River at Oakland Mills. After engineers looked over the proposals, they choose the Missouri Valley Bridge and Iron Company of  Leavenworth, Kansas to build the structure. The long-span combination Pratt truss through and pony truss was completed later the same year. The steel components where manufactured by the Phoenix Iron Company of Pennsylvania. It is one of the oldest Pratt through truss bridges in Iowa. Long closed to vehicular traffic, it was listed on the National Register of Historic Places in 1998.

See also
 
 
 
 
 List of bridges on the National Register of Historic Places in Iowa
 National Register of Historic Places listings in Henry County, Iowa

References

Bridges completed in 1876
Truss bridges in Iowa
Bridges in Henry County, Iowa
National Register of Historic Places in Henry County, Iowa
Road bridges on the National Register of Historic Places in Iowa
1876 establishments in Iowa
Steel bridges in the United States
Pratt truss bridges in the United States